Facility management or facilities management (FM) is a professional management discipline focused on the efficient and effective delivery of logistics and other support services related to real property and buildings. It encompasses multiple disciplines to ensure functionality, comfort, safety and efficiency of the built environment by integrating people, place, process and technology, as defined by the International Organization for Standardization (ISO). The profession is certified through Global Facility Management Association (Global FM) member organizations.

History
The term, "facilities management" was coined in the 1960s by IBM alumnus and Electronic Data Systems founder Ross Perot, in reference to network management of IT systems, and soon expanded to include all elements of commercial space management.

Facility management as integral to the processes of strategic organizational planning was represented during a 1979 conference sponsored by Herman Miller. Following the meeting, the furniture manufacturer opened the Facility Management Institute (FMI), with its headquarters in Ann Arbor, Michigan.

The National Facility Management Association (NFMA) was formed in 1980, separating the overall profession from a single enterprise. In 1982, the NFMA expanded to form the International Facility Management Association (IFMA)

In 1986, the first professional FM organization was launched in the UK, as the Association of Facility Managers (AFM).

Definitions and scope
Professional FM as an interdisciplinary business function has the objective of coordinating demand and supply of facilities and services within public and private organizations. The term "facility" (pl. facilities) means something that is built, installed or established to serve a purpose, International Facility Management Association (IFMA), 1998 which, in general, is every "tangible asset that supports an organization". Examples include: real estate property, buildings, technical infrastructure, HVAC, lighting, transportation, IT-services, furniture, custodial, grounds maintenance and other user-specific equipment and appliances.

In April 2017, the International Organization for Standardization published the ISO 41011:2017 standard for facility management, defining it as the "organizational function which integrates people, place and process within the built environment with the purpose of improving the quality of life of people and the productivity of the core business." The ISO definition was formally adopted by BIFM in August 2017.

A management system standard for facilities management has also been developed by ISO and published as ISO 41001:2018.

Scope
Facilities management is divided into two areas:
 space and infrastructure, such as planning, design, workplace, construction, lease, occupancy, maintenance, and furniture
 people and organisation, such as catering, cleaning, ICT, HR, accounting, marketing, and hospitality.

Its two broad areas of operation are commonly referred to as "hard FM" and "soft FM". The first refers to the physical built environment with a focus on work space and building infrastructure. The second covers the people and the organization and is related to work psychology and occupational physiology.

According to the IFMA: "FM is the practice of coordinating the physical workplace with the people and work of the organization. It integrates the principles of business administration, architecture, and the behavioral and engineering sciences." In a 2017 global job task analysis, IFMA identified eleven competencies of facility management as:
 leadership and strategy
 operations and maintenance
 finance and business
 environmental stewardship and sustainability
 project management
 Human factors and ergonomics
 real estate and property management
 facility and technology management
 risk management
 communication
 quality and performance

The Institute of Workplace and Facilities Management, formerly the British Institute of Facilities Management, adopted the European definition and through its accredited qualification framework offers career path curriculum ranging from school leaver level through to master's degree level that is aligned with the European Qualifications framework.

FM may also cover activities other than business services: these are referred to as non-core functions and vary from one business sector to another. FM is also subject to continuous innovation and development, under pressure to reduce costs and to add value to the core business of public or private sector client organizations.

Accredited academics
Facility management is supported with education, training, and professional qualifications often coordinated by FM institutes, universities, and associations. Degree programs exist at both undergraduate and post-graduate levels. Facility Management has been a recognised academic discipline since the 1990s. Initial FM research work in Europe started in universities in the UK, the Netherlands and the Nordic countries, where academies funded research centers and began to establish courses at Bachelors, Masters, and PhD levels.

Early European FM research centers include the Centre for Facilities Management (CFM), founded in Glasgow in 1990; the Centre for People and Buildings at Delft University of Technology; and Metamorphose at the Norwegian University of Science and Technology. The University of Moratuwa Faculty of Architecture in Sri Lanka has offered a BSc. degree in Facilities Management since 2006.

In 2018, 50 universities and research institutions were represented in EUROFM. The German Facility Management Association (GEFMA) has certified 16 FM study programs and courses at universities and universities of applied sciences in Germany.

As of 2021, the IFMA accredits university degree programs the United States, Sri Lanka, South Korea, Singapore, Germany, Hong Kong, Ireland, and the Netherlands.

Role of the facilities manager 
Facilities managers (FMs) operate across business functions. The main priority of an FM is keeping people alive and safe. Facility managers need to operate at two levels:
 Strategically and tactically: helping clients, customers and end-users understand the potential impact of their decisions on the provision of space, services, cost, and business risk.
 Operationally: ensuring a corporate and cost-effective environment for the occupants to function.

EHS: environment, health and safety 
The FM department in an organization is required to identify, analyze, evaluate, control, and manage many environment and safety-related issues. Failure to do so may lead to unhealthy conditions leading to employees falling sick, injury, loss of business, prosecution, and insurance claims. The confidence of customers and investors in the business may also be affected by adverse publicity from safety lapses.

Fire safety 
The threat from fire carries one of the highest risks to loss of life, and the potential to damage property or shut down a business. The facilities management department will have in place maintenance, inspection, and testing for all of the facility's fire safety equipment and systems, keeping records and certificates of compliance.

Security 
Protection of employees and the business often comes under the control of the facilities management department, particularly the maintenance of security hardware. Manned guarding may be under the control of a separate department.

Maintenance, testing and inspections 
Maintenance, testing, and inspection schedules are required to ensure that the facility is operating safely and efficiently in compliance with statutory obligations, to maximize the life of equipment, and to reduce the risk of failure. The work is planned, often using a computer-aided facility management (CAFM) system. Building maintenance includes all preventative, remedial, and upgrades works required for the upkeep and improvement of buildings and their components. These works may include disciplines such as painting and decorating, carpentry, plumbing, glazing, plastering, and tiling.

Buildings may be designed with a view to minimizing their maintenance requirement.

Cleaning 
Cleaning operations are often undertaken out of business hours, but provision may be made during times of occupations for the cleaning of toilets, replenishing consumables (such as toilet rolls, soap) plus litter picking and reactive response is scheduled as a series of periodic (daily, weekly and monthly) tasks.

Operational 
The facilities management department has responsibilities for the day-to-day running of the building; these tasks may be outsourced or carried out by directly employed staff. This is a policy issue, but due to the immediacy of the response required in many of the activities involved the facilities manager will often require daily reports or an escalation procedure.

Some issues require more than just periodic maintenance, for example, those that can stop or hamper the productivity of the business or that have safety implications. Many of these are managed by the facilities management "help desk" that staff is able to be contacted either by telephone or email. The response to help desk calls is prioritized but may be as simple as too hot or too cold, lights not working, photocopier jammed, coffee spills, or vending machine problems.

Help desks may be used to book meeting rooms, car parking spaces, and many other services, but this often depends on how the facilities department is organized. Facilities may be split into two sections, often referred to as "soft" services such as reception and post room, and "hard" services, such as the mechanical, fire, and electrical services.

Business continuity planning 
All organizations should have a continuity plan so that in the event of a fire or major failure the business can recover quickly. In large organizations, it may be that the staff move to another site that has been set up to model the existing operation. The facilities management department would be one of the key players should it be necessary to move the business to a recovery site.

Space allocation and changes 
In many organizations, office layouts are subject to frequent changes. This process is referred to as churn, and the percentage of the staff moved during a year is known as the "churn rate". These moves are normally planned by the facilities management department using a computer-aided design (CAD) system. In addition to meeting the needs of the business, compliance with statutory requirements related to office layouts include:
 The minimum amount of space to be provided per staff member
 fire safety arrangements
 lighting levels
 signage
 ventilation
 temperature control
 welfare arrangements such as toilets and drinking water
Consideration may also be given to vending, catering, or a place where staff can make a drink and take a break from their desk.

World FM Day
Since 2009, Global FM has sponsored an annual World Facilities Management Day, "World FM Day". The theme for the 2022 World FM Day (22 May 2022) was "leading a sustainable future"; the purpose of the day is " to recognise and celebrate the vital work that workplace and facilities managers and the wider industry contributes to business worldwide".

See also 
 1:5:200
 Activity-based working
 Activity relationship chart
 AM/FM/GIS
 Building management
 Facility information model
 Global Facility Management Association (Global FM)
 Institute of Workplace and Facilities Management
 Building information modeling
 Computerized maintenance management system
 Hard infrastructure
 Janitor
 Physical plant
 Property management
 U.S. GSA Public Buildings Service

References

Further reading
 
 

Property management
Logistics